Ramón Zaydín y Márquez Sterling (1895–1968) was a Cuban politician and Prime Minister of Cuba.

He was an Abogado-notario. He served in the House of Representatives, and was elected as its president from April 1925 to April 1927. He was delegate to the Constitutional Convention of 1940, a Senator, Prime Minister of Cuba (1942-1944), and vice-presidential candidate in the elections of 1944. He was also a professor at the University of Havana School of Law. He was married to Maria Antonia Diago.

References

Fulgencio Batista, From Revolutionary to Strongman (Rutgers University Press, 2006)
 Anuario Social de La Habana 1939, (Luz-Hilo, S.A.) 
 Directorio Social de La Habana 1948, (P. Fernandez y Cia, S. en C.) 
 Libro de Oro de la Sociedad Habanera 1949, (Editorial Lex) 
 Libro de Oro de la Sociedad Habanera 1950, (Editorial Lex) 
 Registro Social de La Habana 1958, (Molina y Cia, S.A.) 
  (Spanish)

Prime Ministers of Cuba
Speakers of the House of Representatives of Cuba
1895 births
1968 deaths
People from Havana
Cuban notaries
Cuban senators
1940s in Cuba
20th-century Cuban politicians